The 1920–21 Maltese First Division was the 10th season of top-tier football in Malta.  It was contested by 9 teams, and Floriana F.C. won the championship.

League standings

Sliema Wanderers F.C. and St. George's F.C. were removed from the competition

Results

References
Malta - List of final tables (RSSSF)

Maltese Premier League seasons
Malta
football
football